Black on Blonde (stylized as BLack on BLonde) is the fifth studio album by Canadian rapper k-os, released January 23, 2013 on Crown Loyalist and EMI Records. A double album, BLack on BLonde is divided into two discs, one consisting of hip hop songs (BLack) and one consisting of rock songs (BLonde).

Guest musicians on the album include Emily Haines, Black Thought, Sebastien Grainger, Travie McCoy, Sam Roberts, Jay Malinowski, Saukrates, Shad and Corey Hart. George Stroumboulopoulos also provides a spoken intro to the track "The Dog Is Mine".

Reception

Black on Blonde received mixed to positive reviews from critics. On Metacritic, the album holds a score of 66/100 based on 4 reviews, indicating "generally favorable reviews".

Track listing

Disc One: BLack

Disc Two: BLonde

References

2013 albums
K-os albums